Naved Shaikh (born 10 August 1993), better known by his stage name Naezy, is an Indian rapper from Mumbai, Maharashtra, who first broke into mainstream rap with the song "Mere Gully Mein" featuring fellow rapper DIVINE. A fictional version of his character has been portrayed by Ranveer Singh in the Zoya Akhtar-directed 2019 musical film Gully Boy. He made his film debut with the hit song "Birju" from the 2015 film Hey Bro, the music video for which featured celebrated Bollywood actors Amitabh Bachchan, Akshay Kumar, Hrithik Roshan, Ajay Devgn, as well as choreographer Prabhu Deva, with the film's lead actor Ganesh Acharya.

Early life 
Naved Shaikh was born 10 August 1993 in Kurla, Mumbai, India. His father is Shaid Raza and mother Farhin Fatma. He grew up in a tenement for the impoverished working class called Ram Bachan Chawl, located in the neighbourhood of Kurla, Mumbai. He comes from a lower-middle-class family.

He was raised as a troubled child mostly by his mother as his father was employed overseas. After a run-in with the law as a juvenile he directed his energies in creative expression of his and others' life struggles.

He completed his T.Y.BSC from Guru Nanak Khalsa College, Matunga, where he met his rapper friend Neykhil Naik aka NCube and formed a collective called The Schizophrenics.

Career 
Naezy debuted with a DIY music video "Aafat!" which he made using an iPad in 2014. Naezy's debut single, "Aafat!', credited as the genesis track of the gully rap scene, was released in 2014, followed by his collaboration with DIVINE on their breakout 2015 hit, "Mere Gully Mein". The song brought attention to the Mumbai rap scene and eventually lead to the breakthrough for both DIVINE and Naezy.

Following the song's release, a documentary titled Bombay 70 (the 70 stands for the area code of Kurla West) about his life was produced. Bombay 70 was directed by independent filmmaker Disha Rindani. The documentary was awarded as the best short film at MAMI in 2014.

Their music caught the attention of director Zoya Akhtar and inspired her to make a film about the Mumbai rap scene called Gully Boy starring Ranveer Singh and Alia Bhatt. The film is loosely based on the lives of DIVINE and Naezy who were consulted for the rap aspects of the film. "Mere Gully Mein" was remade for the film. In this version, Singh's character takes over Naezy's part. Singh re-recorded Naezy's verse for the film. He became the first rapper to be a featured artist on the Indian music streaming platform JioSaavn. He was also featured on the Song "NY se Mumbai" with DIVINE, Singh and American rapper Nas, who also served as an executive producer. The song was released as a promotional single shortly prior to the release of the film.

Naezy's music often addresses socio-political issues and he has spoken about wanting to create music that is "conscious hip-hop" to bring awareness among young people. His songs "Haq Hai", "Tragedy Mein Comedy", "Azaad Hu Mein" are some of the songs that deal with politics and issues that the common man faces.

He has faced issues convincing his family about his rap career, which was one reason he left the underground rap scene in 2018. Another reason he took this hiatus was to get away from the pressures of becoming more famous. The hiatus, however, made him realize his passion for rap music. He returned to the scene in 2019 with his new single "Aafat Wapas" which is a continuation of his first track "Aafat". The video was shot by Happy Mandal who he had worked with before and was shot using an iPhone XS Max. He has uploaded his debut album of six songs titled "Maghreb".

Discography

Albums / EPs

Singles

Film music

References 

Indian rappers
Musicians from Mumbai
Living people
1993 births